Brady Brammer is an American politician. He is a Republican Party (United States) representing the 27th district in the Utah House of Representatives.

Political career 

In 2018, Brammer ran for election to the District 27 seat in the Utah House of Representatives, which was being vacated by fellow Republican Mike Kennedy. He defeated Jared Carman in the Republican primary with 57.5% of the vote, and went on to win the general election with 75.6% of the vote. He is running for re-election in 2020.

In February 2020, Brammer proposed a bill to require warning labels for pornography. A version of the bill became law in April.

As of October 2020, Brammer sits on the following committees:
 Infrastructure and General Government Appropriations Subcommittee
 House Business and Labor Committee
 House Judiciary Committee
 Government Operations Interim Committee
 Judiciary Interim Committee
 Legislative Policy Summit

Electoral record

References 

Living people
Republican Party members of the Utah House of Representatives
21st-century American politicians
Year of birth missing (living people)
Brigham Young University alumni